Brandon Generating Station is a natural gas-fired power station owned by Manitoba Hydro, located in Brandon, Manitoba, Canada.  The station was first built to burn lignite from Saskatchewan.

On 1 January 2010, Unit 5, the sole coal-fired unit, was downgraded to emergency use only, per section 16 of the Manitoba Climate Change and Emissions Reductions Act. Unit 5 was permitted to operate as a generator only under certain circumstances:
 To prevent a situation which would lead to a disruption or destabilization of the power supply.
 In drought years where demand exceeds forecasted supply.
 To maintain the generator in a state of readiness and availability.

The last allowance required Unit 5 to operate for 3–4 days each month at 10–15% of maximum capacity. Unit 5 stopped burning coal on August 1, 2018, and was converted to a synchronous condenser.

Description 

The station consists of:
 4 x 33 MW units (In 1996 three untis were retired, and the last retired in 2001)
 1 x 105 MW coal-fired unit. (Added in 1970, and Converted to Synchronous Condenser operation in 2018)
 2 x 140 MW Alstom natural gas units (installed in 2002).

References

Natural gas-fired power stations in Manitoba
Coal-fired power stations in Manitoba
Buildings and structures in Brandon, Manitoba
Manitoba Hydro